Speed Niggs was a German indie rock band founded in Detmold in Nordrhein-Westfalen in 1989.

History 
Their first album Boston Beigel Yeah! was released shortly after their foundation. It was featured as the record of the month in the German music magazine Spex. The music of this first album sounded rough, similar to demotape, and could be compared to rock acts such as the Jimi Hendrix Experience and songwriters such as Neil Young. At the end of 1989 the readers of Spex magazine elected the Speed Niggs as newcomer of the year.

One year later the second album Another Valley on the long Decline was released. In the tradition of the debut it started with the Neil Young Song Mr. Soul and went on with a guest appearance of Evan Dando of the Lemonheads as singer of Paint it sweet. Their song Toys in the Deep Freeze was put on the sampler Geräusche für die 90er with other influential German bands. In those days the band played many concerts throughout Germany.

The third album 667 – Right Between The Dicks was released in 1991 and had a very different sound. The old rough sound was replaced by conventional hard rock. After some recastings the band split up in 1992.

In 1995 two members of the Speed Niggs came back on stage as Sharon Stoned who were more or less a revival of the original band. In the same year the Speed Niggs' debut album Boston Beigel Yeah! was rereleased on CD. It contained extra tracks like AC/DC's She's got Balls and Neil Young's Lotta Love.

The Speed Niggs were the first German band with a sound similar to popular American guitar bands in those days, mainly bands from Boston such as The Lemonheads and Dinosaur Jr.

Discography 
 1989: Boston Beigel Yeah! (Beat all the Tambourines)
 1990: Another Valley On The Long Decline (Historia)
 1991: 667 - Right Between The Dicks (Beat Hotel)
 1995: Boston Beigel Yeah! - CD-Rerelease (Langstrumpf Records)

As Sharon Stoned:
 1995 License To Confuse (Snoop Records)
 1996 Sample & Hold (Columbia)

External links 
 Indiepedia
 MySpace-Page Speed Niggs
 MySpace-Page Sharon Stoned
 Speed Niggs Live-Video, 1990

References 

German alternative rock groups
Musical groups established in 1989
Detmold